Marie-José Pérec (born 9 May 1968) is a retired French track and field sprinter who specialised in the 200 and 400 metres and is a three-time Olympic gold medalist.

Athletics career
Pérec won the 1991 World Championships 400 metres title in Tokyo and repeated the feat at the 1995 World Championships in Gothenburg. She was also the 400 metres champion at the 1992 Olympic Games in Barcelona. She entered the 200 metres and 400 metres events at the 1996 Olympic Games in Atlanta and won both, thus achieving the second-ever Olympic 200 metres/400 metres gold medal double, after Valerie Brisco-Hooks in Los Angeles 1984. Pérec won the 400 metres title in an Olympic record time of 48.25 seconds, which also ranked her as the third fastest woman of all time. It took 23 years until 2019 before Salwa Eid Naser surpassed her mark to push Pérec to number 4 of all time.

In addition to her Olympic and World titles, Pérec also won the 400 metres title and was a part of the gold medal-winning 4 × 400 metres relay team at the 1994 European Championships in Helsinki.

The two 1996 Olympic titles were Pérec's last international titles. In 1997 Pérec shifted to the 200 metres but withdrew at the semi-finals in the World Championships that year and barely raced at all in 1998 and 1999. Having not run a 400 metres race since 1996, Pérec began her Olympic title defense by finishing third in Nice, behind eventual Olympic silver and bronze medalists Lorraine Graham and Katharine Merry. It was the last significant race Pérec ran. On 22 September 2000, she pulled out of the 200 metres and 400 metres events of the 2000 Olympic Games in Sydney, several days before they were due to begin. Pérec claimed that she had been threatened and insulted several times since arriving in Australia and that the Australian press, who were supporting Australian athlete Cathy Freeman, had been trying to sabotage her chances of winning the gold medal in the 400 metres.

Pérec trained in Los Angeles, California, with the HSI track team and is listed as a legend on the team's page.

Life after retirement from athletics
Pérec enrolled in the top French business school ESSEC and graduated in 2007 with a Master's in Sports Management.

Pérec is a member of the ‘Champions for Peace’ club, a group of more than 70 famous elite athletes committed to promoting peace in the world through sports, created by Peace and Sport, a Monaco-based international organization.

On 21 October 2012, Pérec was elected president of the Ligue Régionale d'Athlétisme de la Guadeloupe, the governing body for athletics in Guadeloupe.

Pérec participated in the French reality music competition Mask Singer as the Panthère, performing Stromae's "Papaoutai" and Angèle's "Balance ton quoi" before being eliminated in the first episode.

Family
Pérec and her partner Sébastien Foucras have one child, a son named Nolan, born 30 March 2010.

Awards
Pérec was chosen as the French Champion of Champions in 1992 and 1996 by the French sports daily L'Équipe.

On 9 October 2013, Pérec was awarded the Officier de la Légion d'honneur by French President François Hollande in the Élysée Palace. Just before presenting the insignia to Pérec during the award ceremony, Hollande described her as "one of the most brilliant athletes in the history of French athletics". Pérec had received the Chevalier de la Légion d'honneur in 1996.

On 16 November 2013, Pérec was inducted into the IAAF Hall of Fame.

Personal bests 

Rankings outside the brackets are world rankings
Rankings inside the brackets are European
FR = French record
OR = Olympic record

References

External links 

 

1968 births
Living people
Black French sportspeople
French female sprinters
Olympic athletes of France
Olympic gold medalists for France
Athletes (track and field) at the 1988 Summer Olympics
Athletes (track and field) at the 1992 Summer Olympics
Athletes (track and field) at the 1996 Summer Olympics
Guadeloupean female sprinters
French people of Guadeloupean descent
Medalists at the 1992 Summer Olympics
Medalists at the 1996 Summer Olympics
World Athletics Championships medalists
European Athletics Championships medalists
Officiers of the Légion d'honneur
European champions for France
Olympic gold medalists in athletics (track and field)
World Athletics Championships winners
Olympic female sprinters
People from Basse-Terre